Andrea Meneghin (born February 20, 1974) is an Italian retired professional basketball player and active coach. Standing at 2.00 m (6 ft. 6  in.), Meneghin was an offense oriented shooting guard-small forward.

Professional career
Meneghin spent almost his whole career with Pallacanestro Varese. He played many seasons in the EuroLeague with Varese and Fortitudo Bologna. Meneghin helped Pallacanestro Varese win the Italian League championship in 1999, something that the team had not achieved since 1978. He was named the Mr. Europa European Player of the Year in 1999. He was also named the MVP of the Italian Supercup in 1999.

National team career
Meneghin was selected to the EuroBasket 1999's All-Tournament Team, after he helped the senior Italian national team to win the gold medal at the tournament. He also played with Italy at the 1998 FIBA World Championship, the 2000 Summer Olympic Games, and the 2001 EuroBasket.

Coaching career
Being considered an icon in Varese, Meneghin started his coaching career during the 2006–07 season, also with the Pallacanestro Varese basketball team.

Personal life
Andrea Meneghin is the son of Dino Meneghin, one of the greatest Italian basketball players in history. Andrea played against his father, during the latter's last season as a pro.

Awards and accomplishments

Pro career
2× FIBA EuroStar: (1998, 1999)
Italian League Champion: (1999)
Mr. Europa: (1999)
Italian Supercup Winner: (1999)
Italian Supercup MVP: (1999)
Italian All-Star Game MVP: (1999)

Italian senior national team
1999 EuroBasket: 
1999 EuroBasket: All-Tournament Team

References

External links

FIBA Profile
FIBA EuroLeague Profile
Euroleague.net Profile
Italian League Profile 

1974 births
Living people
Basketball players at the 2000 Summer Olympics
FIBA EuroBasket-winning players
Fortitudo Pallacanestro Bologna players
Italian basketball coaches
Italian men's basketball players
Lega Basket Serie A players
Olympic basketball players of Italy
Pallacanestro Varese players
Sportspeople from Varese
Shooting guards
Small forwards
1998 FIBA World Championship players